Liam James Kitching (born 25 September 1999) is an English professional footballer who plays for League One club Barnsley, as a defender. He started his career at Leeds United, though did not make a first-team appearance, and also had loan spells at Harrogate Town before joining Forest Green Rovers in July 2019.

Early life
Kitching was born in Harrogate and attended Rossett School.

Career

Leeds United
Kitching began his career at Leeds United and signed a two-year contract with the club in July 2017. After featuring regularly for Leeds' under-23 side during the first half of the season, Kitching joined Harrogate Town on a one-month loan in January 2018. His first appearance for Harrogate came as a substitute in a 4–1 victory over Stockport County before making his first start for Harrogate on 10 February 2018 in a 3–1 victory over Leamington, in which he scored the first goal of his senior career. On 16 February 2018, his loan was extended until the end of the season. After making 9 league appearances for Harrogate, scoring three goals, Harrogate were promoted to the National League after defeating Brackley Town 3–0 in the play-off final. On 20 July 2018, Kitching signed a new contract with Leeds United before rejoining Harrogate on a six-month loan deal. In January 2019, his loan was extended until the end of the season, after scoring three goals in 25 appearances during the first half of the season. Across the 2018–19 season, Kitching appeared in 34 league games for Harrogate, scoring twice.

Forest Green Rovers
Kitching signed with Forest Green Rovers in July 2019 on a three-year contract for an undisclosed fee. He made his debut for Forest Green Rovers as a substitute in their 1–1 League Two draw away to Walsall, before making his first start on 13 August 2020 in a penalties victory over Charlton Athletic following a 0–0 in the EFL Cup, in which Kitching conceded a missed penalty. He appeared in 29 of Forest Green Rovers' 36 league matches across the truncated 2019–20 season.

Barnsley
On 5 January 2021, Kitching signed for Championship club Barnsley on a four-year deal for an undisclosed fee believed to be in the region of £600,000. He scored his first goal for the club on 13 September 2022 in a 1-1 draw against Port Vale.

Style of play
Kitching can play as a centre-back or as a left-back.

Career statistics

References

1999 births
Living people
English footballers
People from Harrogate
Footballers from North Yorkshire
Leeds United F.C. players
Harrogate Town A.F.C. players
Forest Green Rovers F.C. players
Barnsley F.C. players
English Football League players
National League (English football) players
Association football defenders